Palafoxia riograndensis, the Rio Grande palafox or Rio Grande Spanish needles, is a plant species native to Texas, Chihuahua and Coahuila. It is named for the Rio Grande which separates Texas from Mexico.

Flowering heads have no ray flowers but 8-25 pink, purple or white disc flowers.

References

riograndensis
Flora of Coahuila
Flora of Texas
Flora of Chihuahua (state)